Clarence Bernard Griffin (August 26, 1911 – February 27, 1991) was an American Negro league outfielder in the 1930s.

A native of Banks County, Georgia, Griffin made his Negro leagues debut in 1933 with the Columbus Blue Birds. He went on to play for the Cleveland Red Sox and Brooklyn Eagles. Griffin died in Columbus, Ohio in 1991 at age 79.

References

External links
 and Seamheads

1911 births
1991 deaths
Brooklyn Eagles players
Cleveland Red Sox players
Columbus Blue Birds players
20th-century African-American sportspeople
Baseball outfielders